
Smithville may refer to:

Places

Canada
Smithville, Nova Scotia
Smithville, Ontario

United States 

Smithville, Arkansas
Smithville, California, now Loomis, California
Smithville, Georgia
Smithville, Illinois
Smithville, Monroe County, Indiana
Smithville, Owen County, Indiana
Smithville, Bullitt County, Kentucky
Smithville (Duluth), Minnesota, a neighborhood
Smithville, Mississippi
Smithville, Missouri
Smithville, Atlantic County, New Jersey
Smithville, Burlington County, New Jersey
Smithville, New York
Smithville, North Carolina, now Southport, North Carolina
Smithville, Ohio
Smithville, Oklahoma
Smithville, Rhode Island
Smithville, Tennessee
Smithville, Texas
Smithville, Utah, now Gandy, Utah
Smithville, Virginia, now Surry, Virginia
Smithville, West Virginia

Other
Smithville (album), by jazz musician Louis Smith